Automan is an American superhero television series produced by Glen A. Larson. It aired for 12 episodes (although 13 were made) on ABC between 1983 and 1984. It consciously emulates the visual stylistics of the Walt Disney Pictures live-action film Tron, in the context of a superhero TV series. The series was later shown in reruns on the Sci-Fi Channel.

Synopsis

Automan (the "Automatic Man") follows the adventures of a police officer and computer programmer named Walter Nebicher (Desi Arnaz Jr.), who has created an artificially intelligent crime fighting program that generated a hologram (Chuck Wagner) able to leave the computer world at night and fight crime.

While in the real world, Automan posed as a government agent by the name of "Otto J. Mann." This was a secret to all except Walter's close associate, Roxanne Caldwell (Heather McNair).

Nebicher could merge with Automan to become one being, sharing consciousness and skills, while retaining Automan's invulnerability.

Cursor was his sidekick, a floating, shifting polyhedron which could "draw" and generate physical objects as needed. The most common forms taken were a car (the Auto Car), an airplane, and a helicopter, all of which could defy the laws of physics.

The show also starred Robert Lansing as Lieutenant Jack Curtis and Gerald S. O'Loughlin as Captain of Detectives E. G. Boyd, both Walter's superiors. Both believed Automan was a friend of Walter from the FBI. Captain Boyd, a technophobe who had no use for computers, often held up Lieutenant Curtis as the kind of cop he was convinced was the ideal for police – an ideal to which he believed Walter could never rise.

Features
The Automan costume appeared to glow on screen due to its retroreflective sheeting designed by 3M. The fabric was made up of tiny reflective balls, and it was able to reflect nearly 100 percent of the light shone at it (the technique had been used several years earlier for the Kryptonian costumes in Superman). The costume also had highly polished plates attached to it to provide the holographic appearance, all enhanced in post-production through chromakey effects.

The Autocar and Autochopper were the most common vehicles created for transport. Each vehicle would appear or disappear as a sequence of wireframes drawn by Cursor, and were black with strips of reflective tape stuck on them. The Autocar was a Lamborghini Countach LP400 which was capable of making 90-degree turns without losing control and overtaking merely by strafing, rather than turning. However, human passengers not properly secured in their seats would often be thrown around inside with the momentum from the sudden position change.  The Autochopper was a Bell Jetranger capable of landing anywhere. The show also featured a futuristic airplane and motorcycle, while other episodes featured a distinctive handgun and a guitar.

Another prominent feature of Automan was the ability to "wrap himself" around Walter as a means of protecting him. They would appear as one person, but because Walter was inside Automan, he would inadvertently end up speaking in two voices.

However, Automan's excessive use of electricity would often mean he would suffer from power shortage during the daytime, so he was rarely active in sunlight.

Cancellation
Automan was put in the Monday 8 PM ET timeslot where it competed with the popular Scarecrow and Mrs. King as well as TV's Bloopers & Practical Jokes. Because of poor ratings (13.6) and expensive special effects, Automan was canceled after twelve of its thirteen episodes had aired.

Cast
 Desi Arnaz Jr. – Walter Nebicher
 Chuck Wagner – Automan / Otto J. Mann
 Robert Lansing – Lieutenant Jack Curtis
 Gerald S. O'Loughlin – Police Captain E. G. Boyd
 Heather McNair – Roxanne Caldwell

US television ratings

Episodes

DVD release
On October 1, 2012, Fabulous Films released the complete series on DVD in the UK.  This was the first DVD release of the series anywhere in the world.

On August 18, 2015, the show was released on DVD in Australia as a four disc set through Madman Entertainment.

On November 10, 2015, Shout! Factory released the complete series on DVD in Region 1 for the very first time.  The 4-disc set featured all 13 episodes of the series as well as bonus features.

Merchandise
Automan received a slew of merchandise released, mostly in the UK. An action figure, Halloween costume, toy Autocar, Commodore 64 video game and novelization of the pilot episode are among some of the many releases. In the US, the Ja-Ru company released a number of toys based on the show designed to be sold in supermarkets. Such items included toy print sets, money sets, binoculars, etc.

References

External links

 
 

1983 American television series debuts
1984 American television series endings
1980s American comedy-drama television series
American Broadcasting Company original programming
1980s American science fiction television series
English-language television shows
Television series about artificial intelligence
American superhero television series
Television series by 20th Century Fox Television
Television series created by Glen A. Larson
Television series by The Kushner-Locke Company